is a retired Japanese professional baseball pitcher. He played for the Nippon-Ham Fighters during the 1995 Nippon Professional Baseball season.

External links

1971 births
Sportspeople from Hyōgo Prefecture
Living people
Nippon Professional Baseball pitchers
Nippon Ham Fighters players